Thomas MacDonald or Tom MacDonald may refer to:

Thomas MacDonald
 Thomas Logie MacDonald (1901–1973), Scottish astronomer
 Thomas Harris MacDonald (1881–1957), American road-builder
 Thomas MacDonald (cricketer) (1908–1998), Irish cricketer
 Thomas H. MacDonald, British stage and film actor
 Thomas Kennedy Macdonald (1847–1914), New Zealand politician
 Thomas J. MacDonald (born 1965), better known as Tommy Mac (carpenter), American carpenter, woodworker and host

Tom MacDonald
 Sir Tom Macdonald (politician) (1898–1980), New Zealand politician
 Tom Macdonald (writer) (1900–1980), Welsh journalist and novelist
 Tom MacDonald (rapper) (1988–present), Canadian musician
 Tommy Mac (musician), bass player for the Canadian pop punk band Hedley

See also
 Thomas Macdonald-Paterson (1844–1906), politician
 Thomas McDonald (disambiguation)
 Tom McDonald (disambiguation)